R. Steven 'Steve' Bair (born April 9, 1958) is a Republican member of the Idaho State Senate.  He represents the 31st District since 2012. He previously served in District 28 from 2006 to 2012.

Early life, education, and career
Bair was born native and resident of Blackfoot, Idaho. He graduated in 1976 from Snake River High School in Moreland, ID. Bair is a member of the Church of Jesus Christ of Latter-day Saints. Bair is married to Lori Kae Belnap and together they have five children. He attended Ricks College, earning a degree in Farm Crops Management. In addition to being a Senator, Bair was also a farmer. Bair was a Precinct Committeeman.

Idaho Senate

Committees
Bair is currently serving on the following committees:

 Joint Finance and Appropriations - Chairman
 Resources & Environment

Elections

References
Notes

Sources
 Project Vote Smart bio
 Official government website

1958 births
Latter Day Saints from Idaho
Republican Party Idaho state senators
Living people
People from Blackfoot, Idaho
21st-century American politicians